Italy competed at the 1967 Summer Universiade in Tokyo, Japan and won 18 medals.

Medals

Details

References

External links
 Universiade (World University Games)
 WORLD STUDENT GAMES (UNIVERSIADE - MEN)
 WORLD STUDENT GAMES (UNIVERSIADE - WOMEN)

1967
1967 in Italian sport
Italy